ECSPP may refer to:

 The WHO Expert Committee on Specifications for Pharmaceutical Preparations
 The European Chemical Site Promotion Platform